JoAnne A. Epps is an American law professor, legal author, and former Executive Vice President and Provost of Temple University. Epps' primary areas of expertise include criminal procedure, evidence and trial advocacy. She teaches Litigation Basics, a required course for first-year law students at Temple. Named by National Jurist as one of the 25 most influential leaders in legal education, her commitment to curricular innovation and experiential legal education inspired the creation of the Stephen and Sandra Sheller Center for Social Justice at Temple Law School, which introduces students to the many roles that lawyers can play in securing access to civil justice. She has trained Sudanese lawyers representing victims of the Darfur crisis, and taught prosecutors for the UN International Criminal Tribunal for Rwanda.

In 2009, she was named as a potential Barack Obama Supreme Court candidate. Before becoming Temple's Provost, she served as Dean of Temple University Beasley School of Law from 2008-2016. Epps joined the Temple Law School as a faculty member in 1985 and then served as associate dean for Academic Affairs from 1989 to 2008. Prior to coming to Temple, Epps was an Assistant U.S. Attorney in Philadelphia and a Deputy City Attorney for the City of Los Angeles. Epps received a B.A. from Trinity College in Hartford, Connecticut, and a J.D. from Yale Law School.

Publications (Books, Articles, Chapters)
"Life Skills for Happy Lawyers" (Philadelphia Bar Association, Women in the Profession Newsletter), July 2011 
"Passing on the Profession to Young Lawyers", 15 The Woman Advocate 4, 2010
Classical Rhetoric and the Modern Trial Lawyer, 36 Litigation 2, with Paul Mark Sandler & Ronald J. Waicukauski, 2010
"The 12 Secrets of Persuasive Argument", with Paul Mark Sandler & Ronald J. Waicukauski, American Bar Association, 2009
"Lawyers as Community Builders", The Pennsylvania Lawyer, October 2009
"A Tipping Point for Law Schools"? National Law Journal, July 20, 2009
"100 Vignettes for Improving Trial Evidence: Making and Meeting Objections" with Anthony Bocchino and David Sonenshein, National Institute for Trial Advocacy, 2005 
"Trial Evidence: Making And Meeting Objections" (book, videotape and teacher's manual) with D. Sonenshein & A. Bocchino, National Institute for Trial Advocacy, 3rd edition: 2004; 2nd edition: 1990
"The Winning Argument", with P.M. Sandler & R.J. Waicukauski, American Bar Association, 2001  
"LSATs Provide Narrow Gate into Legal Profession", 23 NAT'L L.J., August 28, 2000
"Ethos and the Art of Argument" - 26 Litigation 31, with Paul Mark Sandler and Ronald J. Waicukauski, 1999
"Clarifying the Meaning of Federal Rule of Evidence" 703, 36 B.C.L. Rev. 53, 1994
"Passing the Confrontation Clause Stop Sign: Is All Hearsay Constitutionally Admissible"? 77 KY. L.J. 7, 1988
Chapter: "The Bail Reform Act of 1984," Criminal Defense Techniques (Matthew Bender), 1986

Awards and recognition
Leadership in Diversity Award from Fisher Phillips, 2016 
Industry Icon Award from Philadelphia Inquirer, November 2016.
2016 Spirit of Excellence Award from the American Bar Association Commission on Racial and Ethnic Diversity in the Profession.
M. Ashley Dickerson Diversity Award by the National Association of Women Lawyers, 2015.
Champion of Diversity Award from Pepper Hamilton LLP, 2015.
25 most influential people in legal education by The National Jurist magazine, 2016, 2015, 2014, 2013.
Trinity College conferred Epps with an honorary doctor of laws degree, 2015.
U.S. Senator Robert P. Casey, Jr. honored Epps during Black History Month at the U.S. Senate, February 2015.
One of the 100 most influential black attorneys in the U.S., Lawyers of Color magazine, 2015, 2014, 2013, 2012.
2013 Justice Sonia Sotomayor Diversity Award by the Philadelphia Bar Association.
Torchbearer Award for Outstanding Leadership in Law from the Women's Christian Alliance of Philadelphia, 2011   http://wpsp.blogs.brynmawr.edu/2013/07/01/philadelphia-women-welcome-institute-delegates/
Minority Business Leader Award, 2011, Philadelphia Business Journal.
Wiley A. Branton Award, National Bar Association, 2009  
Sandra Day O'Connor Award, Philadelphia Bar Association, 2009
Trinity College award for career achievements in law, 2009
Take the Lead Award by the Girl Scouts of Eastern Pennsylvania, 2009
Women in the Profession 2007-2008 Woman of the Year Award presented by The Legal Intelligencer and Pennsylvania Law Weekly, 2008. 
Pro Bono Roll of Honor First Judicial District of Pennsylvania, 2008
Temple University's F. Eugene Dixon, Jr. Inspiration Award, 2006
Founders' Award, National Black Prosecutors' Association, 2005
Honorable Robert E. Keeton Faculty Award National Institute for Trial Advocacy, 2004
Outstanding Faculty Athletic Representative All-American Football Foundation, 2003
Gideon Award Temple Law School, 2003    
Women Making History Award, Greater Philadelphia Chapter of the National Association of Women Business Owners, 2002 
Women of Distinction, Barristers' Association of Philadelphia (an affiliate of the National Bar Association) 2002
25 Women of Distinction by Philadelphia Business Journal and the National Association of Women Business Owners, 2001   
Women of Influence, The Legal Intelligencer, 2001
Doris May Harris Image Award National Bar Association's Women Lawyers' Division 1998  
Alumni Service Award Trinity College, 1998

Membership and Service
Chair, AALS Conference on Pretenured Faculty of Color, 2016
Member, American Bar Association, Task Force on Recruitment and Retention of Law Students and Young Lawyers (2014)
Member, AALS Committee on Libraries, 2013-2015
President, Pennsylvania Women's Forum, 2013
Conference Planner, ABA Section on Legal Education Deans' Meeting, 2013
Vice President, Pennsylvania Women's Forum, 2012
Member, NAWL Foundation Board, 2012
Member, Salvation Army of Greater Philadelphia Advisory Board, 2012–present
Chair, Section of Litigation, Overcriminalization Task Force, American Bar Association, 2011-2013
House Committee on Technology and Communications, American Bar Association, 2011-2012
Legal Services Corporation (LSC) Pro Bono Task Force, 2011–present
Treasurer, Pennsylvania Women's Forum, 2011
Independent Outside Auditor, Philadelphia Stop-and-Frisk Procedures, 2011–present
Chair, Section of Litigation, Overcriminalization Task Force, American Bar Association, 2011-2013
Section of Litigation, Task Force on Implicit Bias, American Bar Association, 2010-2012
Board of Directors, Committee of Seventy, 2010-2014
Member, Minority Bar Committee, Pennsylvania Bar Association, 2009-2014
Commission on the Impact of the Economic Crisis on the Profession and Legal Needs, American Bar Association, 2009-2010
Co-Chair, Steering Committee, Philadelphia District Attorney Elect R. Seth Williams' Transition Team, November 2009-January 2010
Co-Chair, Vision 2020 Topic Areas, Vision 2020 Meeting: "365 Days and Counting", 2009-2010
Advisory Council, The Pennsylvania Prison Society, 2009–present
Advisory Board, Public Interest Law Center of Philadelphia, 2009–present
Planning Committee, AALS Section for the Law School Dean Program at the 2010 Annual Meeting, 2009
Co-Chair, NAWL Committee for the Evaluation of Supreme Court Nominees, 2009
Member, Advisory Board, "Women's Power Summit on Law and Leadership", 2008-2009
Planning Committee, Honorary Co-Chair, ALI-ABA/ACLEA Critical Issues Summit, "Equipping Our Lawyers: Law School Education, Continuing Legal Education, and Legal Practice in the 21st Century", 2008-2009     
Executive Committee, AALS Evidence Section, appointed January, 2008  
Standing Committee on Constitution and Bylaws, American Bar Association, 2008-2011
Section of Litigation Leadership, Special Committee on the Litigation Institute for Trial Training, American Bar Association, 2008-2010
Committee of the House of Delegates, Select Committee, American Bar Association, 2008-2009
Section of Litigation Leadership, Reserves, American Bar Association, 2008
Section of Litigation Leadership, Segment Value Membership, American Bar Association, 2008
Standing Committee on Constitution and Bylaws, American Bar Association, 2008-2011
Committee of the House of Delegates, Select Committee, American Bar Association, 2008-2009
Planning Committee, AALS June 2008 Evidence Mid-Year Meeting, 2007-2008  
Support Center for Child Advocates Volunteer, 2007–present
Eastern District of Pennsylvania Magistrate Judge Selection Committee (appointed by Chief Judge Harvey Bartle) (selected Lynn Sitarski), 2007
Planning Committee, Section of Litigation Annual Conference, American Bar Association, 2007-2008
Steering Committee of Nominating Committee, American Bar Association, 2006-2008
Pennsylvania Judicial Independence Commission, 2006–present
Association Nominating Committee, American Bar Association, 2005-2008
Pennsylvania Justice Commission, 2004-2005
Standing Committee on CLE, ABA. 2004-2007
Section of Litigation Delegate to American Bar Association House of Delegates, 2003-2003
Outside Reviewer, Tenure cases Howard University School of Law and University of Tennessee College of Law, 2002-2003
Section of Litigation Council, American Bar Association, 2002-2013 
Philadelphia Bar Association Committee to Promote Fairness in the Courts, 2002-2007
Board of Directors, Women's Way of Philadelphia, 2002-2005
The Content of our Character, Group Leader (a civic initiative to introduce to teenage students the importance of honor and morality as life creeds), 2002
Speaker, LSAC Newcomers' Workshop, 2002
Chair, Mayor's Task Force on Police Discipline (conducted hearings and issued Report), March -November 2001
Honorary Chair, ACLU Annual Dinner, 2001 
Section of Litigation Co-Director of Divisions, ABA, 2001-2002
Host Committee, 2002 Mid-Year Meeting, American Bar Association, 2001-2002
Section of Litigation Co-Director of Divisions, American Bar Association, 2000-2001
Section of Litigation Co-Director of Divisions, ABA, 1998-2000 
President, Defender Organization of Philadelphia, 1999-2006 (member since 1990)
ALI-ABA Committee on Continuing Professional Education (equivalent to the "Board of Directors"), 1997-2003
Advisory Committee, ALI-ABA Program Committee, 1996-2011  
Pennsylvania Bar Association Gender Task Force, Member and Vice-Chair, 1996-2000
Vice President, Defender Organization of Philadelphia, 1995-1999
Co-Chair, Section of Litigation Committee on Training the Advocate, American Bar Association, 1995-1998
Philadelphia Bar Association Judicial Award Committee (determined criteria and recipient), 1995-1996
Vice President, Board of Directors, Pennsylvania Post-Conviction Defender Organization (later "Capital Case Resource Center"), 1995-1997
Race & Ethnicity Commission of the Third Circuit Task Force on Equal Treatment in the Courts; Co-Chair, Issues in Criminal Justice, 1994-1997
Board of Directors, Pennsylvania Post-Conviction Defender Organization (later "Capital Case Resource Center"), 1994-1997
Chair, SEPTA Ad Hoc Committee on the Homeless (Committee was formed following a much-publicized incident culminating in the arrest of a Philadelphia City Councilwoman. I drafted the committee report), 1993                
Barristers' Association Judicial Evaluation Committee, Co-Chair, 1993-1994
Chair, Third Circuit Lawyers' Advisory Committee, 1992-1993 
Chair, Committee on the Board, Board of Trustees, Trinity College, 1992-1994
Board Secretary, Defender Organization of Philadelphia, 1992-1994
Vice Chair, Third Circuit Lawyers' Advisory Committee, 1991-1992
Third Circuit Lawyers' Advisory Committee (appointed by Chief Judge of the Third Circuit), 1990-1993
Member, Presidential Search Committee, Board of Trustees, Trinity College, 1990-1991
Chair, Committee on Student Life, Board of Trustees, Trinity College, 1990-1992
Board of Trustees, Trinity College, 1990-1994
Board of Directors, ACLU of Philadelphia, 1986-1989
Board of Directors, Juvenile Law Center, 1984-1990

References

External links
Temple University Beasley School of Law webpage of JoAnne A. Epps

American legal scholars
Deans of law schools in the United States
Women deans (academic)
Living people
Temple University faculty
Trinity College (Connecticut) alumni
Yale Law School alumni
People from Cheltenham, Pennsylvania
Temple University administrators
American women legal scholars
Year of birth missing (living people)